Marie Luise Neunecker (born 17 July 1955) is a German horn player and professor at the Hochschule für Musik "Hanns Eisler".

Professional career 
Neunecker was born in Erbes-Büdesheim. She studied musicology and German studies. In 1978 she started her career at the Opern- und Schauspielhaus Frankfurt as second horn. In 1979 she was appointed principal horn with the Bamberg Symphony, and from 1981 to 1989 she held the same position with the hr-Sinfonieorchester. She has appeared as a soloist with various orchestras worldwide, and is also active as a chamber music player.

In 1986 she won first prize at the Concert Artists Guild international competition in New York.

In 1988 she was appointed professor at the Frankfurt Academy of Music and Performing Arts, and in 2004 she was appointed professor of horn at the Hochschule für Musik "Hanns Eisler".

Volker David Kirchner dedicated his Orfeo for baritone, horn and piano on poems from Rilke's Sonnets to Orpheus to her, premiered on 6 May 1988 in Karlsruhe with Hermann Becht and Nina Tichman.

György Ligeti dedicated to her his Hamburg Concerto, which she premiered on 20 January 2001 in Hamburg with the Asko Ensemble. She also recorded the work for Teldec's Ligeti Project series.

Recordings include works by Britten, Hindemith, Mozart and Richard Strauss and also lesser known repertory, such as horn concertos by Reinhold Glière, Paul Hindemith, Othmar Schoeck, and Vissarion Shebalin; three works for horn and piano by Alexander Glazunov; Poème by Charles Koechlin; and the concerto for violin, horn and orchestra by Ethel Smyth.

Discography

Concertante works

Chamber music

Notes

External links
 Marie Luise Neunecker at Künstlersekretariat Schoerke
 Marie Luise Neunecker at the Semperoper
 Entries for Marie Luise Neunecker on WorldCat

German classical horn players
German women academics
Living people
1955 births
People from Alzey-Worms
Hochschule für Musik und Tanz Köln alumni
20th-century German women musicians
20th-century classical musicians
20th-century German musicians
21st-century German women musicians
21st-century classical musicians
21st-century German musicians
Academic staff of the Hochschule für Musik Hanns Eisler Berlin
Women horn players